Carole Helene Antoinette Thate (born 6 December 1971, in Utrecht) is a Dutch former field hockey player, who played 168 international matches for the Netherlands, in which she scored forty goals. She made her debut on 20 November 1989 in a friendly match against England.

Biography 
Thate was a member of the Holland squad that won the bronze medal at the 1996 Summer Olympics in Atlanta, Georgia, and once again four years later at the 2000 Summer Olympics in Sydney. She captained the team for several years, and played as a midfielder for Dutch clubs Shinty, Schaerweyde, Kampong and Amsterdam. After she quit playing hockey and became the director of the Dutch Johan Cruijff Foundation in Amsterdam. Thate is married,  to one of the highest international goal scorers, the Australian striker Alyson Annan. They had their first child, Sam, in May 2007. Their second son, Cooper, was born in October 2008.

College

In 1996, while at James Madison, Thate won the Honda Award (now the Honda Sports Award) as the nation's best field hockey player.

References

External links
 
 Dutch Hockey Federation

1971 births
Living people
Dutch female field hockey players
Field hockey players at the 1992 Summer Olympics
Field hockey players at the 1996 Summer Olympics
Field hockey players at the 2000 Summer Olympics
Medalists at the 1996 Summer Olympics
Medalists at the 2000 Summer Olympics
Olympic bronze medalists for the Netherlands
Olympic field hockey players of the Netherlands
Olympic medalists in field hockey
Sportspeople from Utrecht (city)
James Madison University alumni
Lesbian sportswomen
LGBT field hockey players
Dutch LGBT sportspeople
21st-century Dutch LGBT people